The Department of Infrastructure, Transport, Regional Development and Communications and the Arts (DITRDCA), formerly Department of Infrastructure, Transport, Regional Development and Communications (DITRDC), is a department of the Australian Federal Government responsible for delivering Australian Government policy and programs for infrastructure, transport, regional development, communications, cultural affairs, and the arts. The department was formed on 1 February 2020 from the Department of Infrastructure, Transport, Cities and Regional Development and the Department of Communications and the Arts The announcement of the merger of the two departments was criticised, being seen as an attack on the arts. The department retained the portfolio relating to arts.

Ministers
After the 2022 Australian election that returned a Labor government under Anthony Albanese, the department name became Department of Infrastructure, Transport, Regional Development and Communications and the Arts.

 and the Ministers of State for the Department are:

Minister for Infrastructure, Transport, Regional Development and Local Government: Catherine King
Minister for Regional Development, Local Government and Territories: Kristy McBain
Minister for Communications: Michelle Rowland
Minister for the Arts: Tony Burke
Minister for Northern Australia: Madeleine King
Assistant Minister for Infrastructure and Transport: Carol Brown
Assistant Minister for Regional Development: Anthony Chisholm

Office for the Arts
The Office for the Arts is responsible for the funding, development and protection of the arts in Australia.

References 

Government departments of Australia
Ministries established in 2020
Communications ministries
2020 establishments in Australia
Public works ministries
Infrastructure in Australia
Regions of Australia